Gunan, King of the Barbarians is a 1982 film directed by Franco Prosperi.

Production
Gunan, King of the Barbarians uses footage from One Million Years B.C..

Release
Gunan, King of the Barbarians was released in Italy on 9 September 1982. The film has also been released as The Invincible Barbarian.

As of 2016 the only available copies of Gunan, King of the Barbarians were home made DVDs sold on eBay that are sourced from pan-and-scan transfers from VHS tapes.

Reception
Colin Greenland reviewed The Invincible Barbarian for Imagine magazine, and stated that "What makes this Invincible Barbarian invincible? Probably the fact that everybody he comes up against is even more stupid than he is. See how long you can watch this one without giggling."

From retrospective reviews, the German book Lexicon des Fantasy-Films referred to the film as a rip-off of Conan the Barbarian but "only dumber".

References

Footnotes

Sources

External links
 

Peplum films
Sword and sandal
Sword and sandal films
Films directed by Franco Prosperi
1980s Italian films